Maurice Hasson (born 6 July 1934, in France) is a French-Venezuelan violinist.

He studied at the Paris Conservatoire with Line Talluel and Joseph Calvet, winning a First Prize for Violin, "Grand Prix" for chamber music, and the first “Prix d'Honneur" Prize awarded in 60 years. He was a laureate of the Thibaud Violin Competition 1951, where he met Henryk Szeryng, who would become his teacher for many years. He emigrated with his first wife, pianist Monique Duphil, and their two daughters to Venezuela from 1960 to 1973.

Upon his move to London in 1973, he made his debut at the Royal Albert Hall Promenade Concerts, playing Paganini Concerto No. 1 and his USA debut with the Cleveland Orchestra conducted by Lorin Maazel in 1978. He has since performed with virtually all the major orchestras in Europe, Israel and the United States under the baton of Sir Colin Davis, Yehudi Menuhin, Kurt Masur, Eliahu Inbal, Sir Simon Rattle, Sir Andrew Davis and Gustavo Dudamel to name only a few. In 1976, he recorded the Bach Double Concerto with Szeryng and the Academy of St. Martin’s in the Fields, directed by Sir Neville Marriner.

Hasson has been awarded the Medaille de Vermeil from the city of Paris, and refused honours from the Venezuelan government. 
He owned the 1727 'Benvenuti, Halphen' Stradivarius until 2005.

Hasson resides in London with his second wife, Janet Hoogesteijn, with whom he has two children and five grandchildren, and held a professorship of violin at the Royal Academy of Music from 1986 - 2015.

References 

1934 births
Living people
Academics of the Royal Academy of Music
Conservatoire de Paris alumni
20th-century French male violinists
21st-century French male violinists
Honorary Members of the Royal Academy of Music